Jessica Jung (born Jessica Sooyoun Jung; April 18, 1989), also known by the mononym Jessica, is a  Korean-American singer-songwriter, actress, author, fashion designer and businesswoman known for her work as a former member of South Korean girl group Girls' Generation. As an actress, Jung portrayed Elle Woods in the Korean version of the musical Legally Blonde in 2010 and played a role in the television drama Wild Romance in 2012. In August 2014, she established a fashion brand, Blanc & Eclare. The next month, she was dismissed from Girls' Generation due to alleged conflicts between the group's schedule and her own business activities. Following the dismissal, Jessica ended her contract with SM Entertainment in 2015 and signed with Coridel Entertainment in 2016, prior to the release of her debut solo album With Love, J. In May 2018, she signed a contract with United Talent Agency. Her debut best-selling novel Shine was released in September 2020.

Early life
Jessica Jung was born in San Francisco. While on vacation in South Korea, she and her sister, Krystal, were spotted in a shopping mall by a member of SM Entertainment; she later joined the company in 2000. She spent seven years as a trainee before debuting as part of the Korean girl group Girls' Generation. Jessica attended Korea Kent Foreign School during her teenage years.

Career

2007–2014: Girls' Generation and solo activities

Jessica was the first member of Girls' Generation to sign with SM Entertainment in 2000. In 2007, she was chosen as a member of the nine-member girl group that debuted on August 5, 2007. In addition to her group activities, Jessica released two singles with Seohyun and Tiffany: "Love Hate" (lit. Bad Older Brother) and "Mabinogi (It's Fantastic!)". Jessica collaborated with 8Eight for the song "I Love You" from their second album, Infinity, which was released on March 3, 2008. Though she was the one singing the harmony and adlibs, she is not seen in the music video. In addition, she had various duets — one with Shinee member, Onew, called "One Year Later", and one with Park Myung-soo, "Naengmyeon". She sang the "Seoul Song" with Super Junior's Leeteuk, Sungmin, Donghae, Siwon, Ryeowook and Kyuhyun and fellow group members Taeyeon, Sunny, Sooyoung and Seohyun. Jessica made her musical theatre debut in the South Korean production of Legally Blonde, alongside Lee Ha-nui and Kim Ji-woo; the production opened on November 14, 2009. The same year, she took a special part on the show Infinity Challenge for their summer special, in which she was chosen to sing a duet entitled "Naengmyun" with Park Myung-soo, one of the MCs.

In March 2010, she had a cameo role on SBS' Oh! My Lady. In May 2010, Jessica became a regular guest on the show Happy Birthday until she withdrew on June 7, 2010, due to Girls' Generation's overseas activities. She was also a regular guest on the show Star King with fellow member Yuri. Jessica released a digital single titled "Sweet Delight" on October 13, 2010. In 2011, Jessica participated on the soundtrack of the KBS drama Romance Town with the song "Because Tears Are Overflowing". Jessica made her acting debut in Wild Romance in 2012. In the same year, Jessica returned to musical theatre once again with Legally Blonde, alongside Jung Eun-ji and Choi Woori. Her first performance was on November 28. In the same year, Jessica sang "What To Do" (featuring Kim Jin-pyo) for the drama Wild Romance, "Butterfly" (featuring Krystal) for To The Beautiful You, "Heart Road" for The King's Dream, as well as "My Lifestyle", a Hyundai i30's commercial song. In 2013, she had "The One Like You" for Dating Agency: Cyrano.

In 2014, Jessica released "Say Yes"' for the Make Your Move soundtrack, featuring her sister, Krystal, and Exo's former member, Kris. In August, Jung launched her own fashion line, Blanc, which was later renamed Blanc & Eclare. There are now sixty stores located around the world. Jessica and her sister Krystal starred in their own reality television show Jessica & Krystal. It premiered on June 3 and consisted of ten episodes.

On September 30, 2014, Jessica announced on her personal Weibo account that she had been "forced out" of the group. SM Entertainment later confirmed this, stating that Jung would no longer be a member of Girls' Generation. The company also stated that Girls' Generation would continue to promote with eight members while it would still manage her solo activities. Jessica also released a statement of her own through her fashion company, Blanc Group, explaining that she had been asked to leave Girls' Generation by the agency and the other members of the group. Jessica's final song with Girls' Generation was "Divine", which was included in the repackaged version of their Japanese greatest hits album, The Best.

2015–2016: Acting and solo debut

In 2015, Jessica was confirmed to be the female lead in the Chinese romantic comedy film titled I Love That Crazy Little Thing, alongside William Chan and Nicholas Tse. The film was released in August 2016, and Jessica collaborated with Chan on the theme song "Love! Love! Aloha!". On August 6, 2015, SM Entertainment released an official statement stating that the company and the former member of Girls' Generation had officially parted ways. The following year, Jessica was confirmed to be the female lead in the autobiographical film about Stephon Marbury titled My Other Home, alongside Marbury himself. She was also cast in the short action comedy Two Bellmen Three alongside Ki Hong Lee. She took a part in Chinese sport's variety show YES! Coach as well, where she participated in a swimming competition after being trained by professional swimmer Sun Yang. Jessica then became the main host of the beauty show Beauty Bible, alongside Kim Jae-kyung.

In February 2016, Jessica announced that her first solo album would be released under her new agency, Coridel Entertainment. In April 2016, representatives announced that Jung would release her first album in May. On April 30, Coridel Entertainment released the track list which included the title track "Fly" featuring Fabolous. Jung wrote and composed four of the six tracks. The name of the extended play was revealed to be With Love, J, and was released on May 17, 2016, along with the lead single, "Fly". The music video for "Fly" amassed over 2 million views within 24 hours of its release. A video for the second single, "Love Me the Same," was released the following day on May 18, 2016. With Love, J topped eight music charts, and also ranked first on the Hanteo Weekly Chart and Gaon Weekly Album Chart. The English-language version of the EP, released on May 27, features five of the original six tracks. The same year, Jung held an Asian fan-meet tour which commenced in Seoul on June 1, continuing on to other countries such as Thailand, Taiwan, and Japan. The tour ended on November 5 in Shanghai. Further shows scheduled to take place in Singapore, Indonesia, Philippines, and Vietnam were cancelled due to health problems and concerns of overwork for Jessica before the release of her next album. In December, Jung made a comeback with a Christmas EP called Wonderland, composed of six songs, four of which she took part in writing. The album, and its eponymous title track, was released on December 10.  It also has an English-language version, with four of the six original Korean tracks.

2017–present: My Decade, debut novel, and Chinese activities

On April 14, 2017, Coridel Entertainment released a series of teaser pictures confirming that Jessica was set to make her first comeback of the year with a digital single titled "Because It's Spring", on April 18, 2017. In the same month, Forbes included Jessica in their 30 Under 30 Asia 2017 list which comprises 30 influential people under 30 years old who have made substantial effect in their fields. "Because It's Spring" was later included on her third EP My Decade, released on August 9, 2017, to celebrate her 10th anniversary since debut. Jessica took part in writing five of the six songs on the album. The lead single "Summer Storm" and its music video were released on the same day. In July 2017, Jung embarked on her first mini-concert tour titled "On Cloud Nine". The tour's first show was in Taipei, taking place on July 29, 2017. Jung also held shows in Seoul, Osaka, Tokyo, and Bangkok as part of the tour. A show scheduled to take place in Hong Kong on October 15, 2017, was cancelled due to Typhoon Khanun affecting the area. The final show of "On Cloud Nine" took place in Macau on March 3, 2018.

In May 2018, it was revealed that Jessica had signed with United Talent Agency. The agency will represent her in North America for music, film, television and endorsements. In October, Jung held a second mini-concert in Taiwan titled "Golden Night". On December 14, Jessica released a Christmas single titled "One More Christmas" in collaboration with South Korean makeup brand Amuse Cosmetics.

In June 2019, Jessica and Krystal filmed their second reality show in the United States. Jessica's single, "Call Me Before You Sleep" was digitally released on September 26 and features rapper Giriboy in the Korean version. The Japanese version was physically released on October 9 and featured Sandaime J Soul Brothers' CrazyBoy. The song was produced by Cha Cha Malone. She held a fan-meet in Japan, XOXO Jessica Jung Fan Meeting, on October 2, with girl group GWSN appearing as the opening act.  Further shows were held in Taiwan and Thailand, on October 19 and 27 respectively. In the same month, it was announced that Jung would publish her debut novel, Shine, in fall 2020 as part of a two-book deal with Simon Pulse, an imprint of Simon & Schuster. Glasstown Entertainment sold the novel to eleven foreign countries, and is developing a film adaptation produced by Matthew Kaplan of ACE Entertainment. The novel was released on September 30, 2020, debuting at number five on The New York Times Best Seller list for Young Adult Hardcover in the issue dated October 18. A sequel, Bright, was released on May 10, 2022.

From May 20 to August 5, 2022, Jessica participated in the third season of Sisters Who Make Waves, a Chinese survival reality television show where female celebrities over 30 years old compete to debut in a ten-member girl group. She eventually placed second in the finals and debuted in X-Sister. Jung also took part in the musical reality show Sound Like Summer Flowers as a team manager. She later reunited with her castmates from Sisters Who Make Waves to star in the reality show Seaside Band, which premiered in November 2022.

Other ventures

Endorsements
Jessica has also endorsed a number of brands of various products. Besides her endorsements with Girls' Generation, she also became a model for Chinese sports brand Li-Ning and South Korean bag brand Lapalette with her sister Krystal in 2014. On April 30, 2020, Jung was announced as the new global ambassador for multinational cosmetics, skin care, fragrance, and personal care company Revlon.

Business
Jung launched her fashion brand Blanc & Eclare in August 2014. Her first restaurant named Clareau opened on January 19, 2021, at the Blanc & Eclare flagship store building in Cheongdam-dong, Seoul.

Personal life
During a mini concert at Taiwan in July 2017, Jung revealed that her birth name, as on her passport, is "Jessica Jung", whereas her Korean name "Soo-yeon" was only obtained on a later date due to necessity. She describes herself as "Christian curious" and goes to church.

Discography

Extended plays
 With Love, J (2016)
 Wonderland (2016)
 My Decade (2017)

Filmography

Film

Television series

Television shows

Theater

Bibliography

Awards and nominations

References

External links

 
 Jessica Jung at Coridel Entertainment
 
 

1989 births
Living people
Actresses from San Francisco
American chief executives of fashion industry companies
American dance musicians
American expatriates in South Korea
American fashion businesspeople
American fashion designers
American musicians of Korean descent
American musical theatre actresses
American people of South Korean descent
American retail chief executives
American television actresses
American women company founders
American company founders
Businesspeople from San Francisco
Girls' Generation members
Japanese-language singers of South Korea
Korean-language singers of the United States
Mandarin-language singers of South Korea
K-pop singers
Singers from San Francisco
SM Entertainment artists
South Korean female idols
South Korean film actresses
South Korean television actresses
South Korean women pop singers
American women chief executives
American women fashion designers